Armen Babalaryan (born 15 August 1971) is an Armenian football midfielder.

Between 1989 and 1991, he played for famous Armenian clubs like Ararat Yerevan and Kotayk Abovyan.
He was also capped for the USSR U-20 team at the 1991 FIFA World Youth Championship.

External links
Web archive of Statistics at KLISF

1971 births
Living people
Soviet footballers
Armenian footballers
Soviet Armenians
Soviet Top League players
Association football midfielders
FC Ararat Yerevan players